John George MacCarthy (1829–1892) was an Irish Home Rule League politician.

He first stood for election for Mallow at a by-election in 1872, but was unsuccessful. He was then elected for the seat at the next general election in 1874.

References

External links
 

UK MPs 1874–1880
1829 births
1892 deaths
Home Rule League MPs
Members of the Parliament of the United Kingdom for County Cork constituencies (1801–1922)